Samphao Lom is a tambon (subdistrict) of Phra Nakhon Si Ayutthaya District, the capital district of Phra Nakhon Si Ayutthaya Province.

History and toponymy
Its name "Samphao Lom" literally means "capsized junk". Owing this area is the confluence of two rivers, Pa Sak and Chao Phraya, with the terrain like a three-way junction. The torrent have made it a point where boats and ships as well as junks often capsized and sank since Ayutthaya was the capital of Thailand more than 600 years ago.

Legendarily Chinese princess Soi Dok Mak's ship capsized and sank in front of neighbouring Wat Phanan Choeng. Another legend tells that it came from Chinese junks that sank from trading here. Accidents tend to capsize and sink frequently. There was a story that when the water receded many shipwrecks will be visible.

Records in the Ayutthaya period states there were floating houses lined up from the front of Wat Phanan Choeng to Wat Chaiwatthanaram. In that era, this area was considered a large floating market and there was a network of waterways with floating houses extending into the river as far as eight blocks, estimated that there were as many as 10,000 floating houses. Often there were ships carrying non-timber forest product or inland product from Tak and Phetchabun to trade. There was a Chinese community located around Wat Phanan Choeng. Also there was a multi-ethnic community of expatriates were Portuguese, Dutch, Japanese and Cham Muslims. They were permitted by the Ayutthaya royal court to settle on both sides of the Chao Phraya River below Wat Phanan Choeng. Junks were often anchored for trading; and on the way to the Pa Sak River. It was the location of the royal junk dock. 

According to Phraya Boranrajathanin, the governor of Monthon Khrung Kao (the official name of Phra Nakhon Si Ayutthaya Province during the Chulalongkorn's reign) and key archaeologist in that era. The land of the downtown Ayutthaya was originally not an island. But it looks like a cape extends from Thung Hantra (Hantra Field) from west to east up till the Chao Phraya River line that flows from the north and flows loop to the south direction up till in front of Wat Phanan Choeng. This makes the cape-shaped land to be island surrounded by water on three sides. 

In the east part, there was a ditch named Khu Khue Na draining from Hua Ro (now a populated place and namesake historic market in the northeast edge near Chandra Kasem Palace) to meet the Chao Phraya River in front of Wat Phanan Choeng. In the Maha Thammaracha's reign, he ordered the excavation to expand this waterway wider than before. As time passed, the current flowed faster and more violently. It eroded the banks and collapsed into a Pa Sak River known today. Thus, downtown Ayutthaya was surrounded by water on all sides like an island. Hence the name "Ayutthaya island" since then.

At present, Samphao Lom area is still often in accidents where boat and ship capsizes and sinks.

Geography
Samphao Lom is considered to be the central area in the lower part of Phra Nakhon Si Ayutthaya District, which is outside the Ayutthaya island.

The geography of Samphao Lom is a lowland, therefore, it is suitable for rice cultivation. There is waterlogging in the rainy season. There was a flood for about 2-3 months with the Chao Phraya River flowing through. Without a forest in the area.

Neighbouring subdistricts are, clockwise from north, Pratu Chai, Ko Rian, Khlong Takhian, and Pak Kran. All of them were in its district.

Administration
Samphao Lom is administered by the Subdistrict Administrative Organization (SAO) Samphao Lom (องค์การบริหารส่วนตำบลสำเภาล่ม).

The area also consists of 11 administrative muban (village)

The emblem of Samphao Lom SAO shows a junk sailing on the water surface.

Population
The residents of Samphao Lom prefer to set up houses on two banks of the khlong (canal) and on the roadside. Most of the houses are close to each other. The houses were distributed in groups along the length of the road.

In 1998 it had a total population of 6,368 people.

Places
Wat Phutthaisawan
Portuguese Village
Wat Khun Phrom
Saint Joseph Catholic Church, Ayutthaya

Notes

References

External links
 
Tambon of Phra Nakhon Si Ayutthaya Province
Populated places on the Chao Phraya River
Historic districts in Thailand